Walking football is a variant of association football that is aimed at keeping people aged over 50 involved with football if, due to a lack of mobility or for other reasons, they are not able to play the traditional game. The sport can be played both indoors and outdoors. Walking football was devised as a competitive sport by John Croot of Chesterfield FC.
Coverage of a walking football session, initially believed to be an April Fools' joke, on Sky Sports News and a documentary aired on Sky Sports Football in October 2017, led to several other clubs taking up this version of the game. It has since become a current craze.

There are now thousands of teams and session all over the UK with player now featuring in over 50s, over 60, and over 70s. The sport has also proved popular with women and is played by women from over 40s.

Though based on association football (albeit with more than 50 differences), the key difference in the rules, from standard football, is that if a player runs then they concede a free kick to the other side. This restriction, together with a ban on slide tackles, is aimed both at avoiding injuries and facilitating the playing of the sport by those who are physically disadvantaged. The manner in which the sport is played promotes cardiovascular fitness whilst producing the least stress on the body. It also helps participants maintain an active lifestyle.
In walking football the game was originally played without goalkeepers (though goalkeepers now play in some variations) and, crucially, the ball must never be kicked above head height. Different footballs are used in the indoor and the outdoor variations of the sport. When played indoors, a size 4 futsal ball is used. Outdoor games involve a traditional football. The size of the pitch can vary to suit different locations. The length should be from 20 to 40 yards and the width between 15 and 30 yards.

The sport came to wider public attention in July 2014, when Barclays Bank aired a television advertisement featuring walking football to promote their services.

The Governing Body of walking football in England is The Walking Football Association. Other home nations, such as Wales and Scotland have their own governing bodies.

In 2018 an International governing body was established to help promote and coordinate international matches between nations. This body is FIWFA and is based in the UK.

Walking Football World Cup

Although there were discussions FIWFA will hold the first Walking Football World Cup in England in 2020, the first edition will be Derby 2023, with 32 teams in the over 50s and over 60s age bracket. Teams from Asia, Africa, South America and Europe will be present at the World Cup tournament.

References

External links
 

Association football variants
Walking
Football
2010s fads and trends
2012 establishments in England
Sports originating in England